Chowkara or Chukara is town and union council of Karak District in Khyber Pakhtunkhwa province of Pakistan. It is located at 33°1'50N 71°1'52E at an altitude of 469 metres (1541 feet) and forms a part of Takht-e-Nasarati Tehsil.

References

Union councils of Karak District
Populated places in Karak District
Karak District